The 66th edition of the KNVB Cup started on October 8, 1983. The final was played on May 2, 1984: Feyenoord beat Fortuna Sittard 1–0 and won the cup for the sixth time. Replays were held if teams were tied after ninety minutes.

Teams
 All 18 participants of the Eredivisie 1983-84
 All 17 participants of the Eerste Divisie 1983-84
 29 teams from lower (amateur) leagues

First round
The matches of the first round were played on October 8 and 9, 1983.

E Eredivisie; 1 Eerste Divisie; A Amateur teams

Replays

Second round
The matches of the second round were played on November 12 and 13, 1983.

Replays

Round of 16
The matches of the round of 16 were played during January, 1984.

Replays

Quarter finals
The quarter finals were played between February 29 and March 4, 1984.

Replay

Semi-finals
The semi-finals were played on March 28, 1984.

Replay

Final

Feyenoord also won the Dutch Eredivisie championship, thereby taking the double. They would participate in the European Cup, so finalists Fortuna Sittard could play in the Cup Winners' Cup.

See also
 Eredivisie 1983-84
 Eerste Divisie 1983-84

External links
 Netherlands Cup Full Results 1970–1994 by the RSSSF

1983-84
1983–84 domestic association football cups
KNVB Cup